Eryngium vaseyi is a species of flowering plant in the family Apiaceae known by the common name coyotethistle. It is endemic to California, where it is known from vernal pools and similar wet habitat in the Central Valley and certain areas of the Central Coast Ranges and southern California coast. This is a decumbent to upright perennial herb with spreading branches up to half a meter long. The lance-shaped to oblong leaves may be up to 24 centimeters long. The edges are deeply cut into narrow, sharp-pointed lobes. The inflorescence is an array of somewhat rounded flower heads surrounded by several narrow, pointed bracts with spiny edges. The head blooms in whitish petals.

External links
Jepson Manual Treatment
USDA Plants Profile
UC CalPhotos gallery

vaseyi
Endemic flora of California
Natural history of the California chaparral and woodlands
Natural history of the Central Valley (California)
Taxa named by John Merle Coulter
Flora without expected TNC conservation status